Cristian Neagu (born 9 November 1980) is a Romanian retired footballer and manager. He was the head coach for the Stetson Hatters men's soccer program until February 2020. A former recruiting coordinator at UNC Chapel Hill, Neagu was part of the Tar Heels men's soccer program who reached back to back NCAA "Final Four" appearances in 2016 and 2017.

College and amateur
Neagu moved to the United States in 2000 to play college soccer at Bryant & Stratton College. In his first year in 2000, Neagu helped the Bobcats reach the NJCAA final and then a year later led them to an NJCAA title in 2001 and was named first team All-American that same year.

In 2002, Neagu transferred to Virginia Commonwealth University where he started in 43 games during his two years at VCU and was named Second Team All-CAA in 2002 and 2003.

Neagu also played four seasons for Richmond Kickers Future.

Professional 
In 2006, Neagu joined USL Second Division club Richmond Kickers. In his only season with Richmond, Neagu made 14 appearances and scored four goals on the way to a USL Second Division title for Richmond. He was also a player-coach for the Fredericksburg Gunners from 2007 to 2009.

Honours 
Richmond Kickers
 USL Second Division Champions (1): 2006

References

External links 
 Cristian Neagu bio

1980 births
Living people
Romanian footballers
Romanian football managers
Romanian expatriate footballers
VCU Rams men's soccer players
Richmond Kickers Future players
Richmond Kickers players
Fredericksburg Gunners players
Northern Virginia Royals players
USL League Two players
USL Second Division players
Romanian expatriate football managers
Romanian expatriate sportspeople in the United States
Expatriate soccer players in the United States
Fredericksburg Gunners coaches
North Carolina Tar Heels men's soccer coaches
Stetson Hatters men's soccer coaches
Association football forwards
Association football player-managers
Expatriate soccer managers in the United States
Bryant and Stratton College alumni
Eckerd Tritons men's soccer coaches
Louisburg Hurricanes men's soccer coaches
Sportspeople from Ploiești